Beringel is a town (vila) and parish (freguesia) in Beja Municipality, Alentejo in Southern Portugal. The population in 2011 was 1,301, in an area of 15.04 km2. 

Three famous Portuguese singers were born in Beringel: António Zambujo, Cândida Branca Flor and Linda de Suza.

References

Freguesias of Beja, Portugal